Chak Manju is a town and union council of the Gujrat District, in the Punjab province of Pakistan. The Pakistan Muslim League (Q), Pakistan Muslim League (N), and Pakistan Tehreek-e-Insaf are among the most popular political parties in the area.

References 

Union councils of Gujrat District
Populated places in Gujrat District